Konnathady  is a gram panchayat village in Idukki district in the Indian state of Kerala. It is situated 14 km south of National Highway 49, just south of the Mullayar River.

Demographics
 India census, Konnathady had a population of 14,637 with 14,455 males and 15,586 females.

References

External links

Villages in Idukki district